Dream Bank is an ocean bank and drowned reef, off the coast of south Texas in the Gulf of Mexico.  It has distinct terraces show past stable sea levels. Other nearby drowned reefs include Baker, Aransas, Blackfish, Mysterious, and one other.

References 

Reefs of the United States
Undersea banks of the Atlantic Ocean